Turbonilla edgarii is a species of sea snail, a marine gastropod mollusk in the family Pyramidellidae, the pyrams and their allies.

Distribution
This marine species occurs in the following locations:
 European waters (ERMS scope)
 Mediterranean Sea : Israeli part of the Mediterranean Sea - Eastern Basin (introduced: alien)
 Mersin Bay

References

 Melvill J.C., 1896: Descriptions of new species of minute marine shells from Bombay; Proceedings of the Malacological Society of London 2: 108-116, pl. 8
 van Aartsen J. J., Barash A. & Carrozza F., 1989: Addition to the knowledge of the Mediterranean Mollusca of Israel and Sinai; Bollettino Malacologico 25 (1-4): 63-76

External links
 To Biodiversity Heritage Library (1 publication)
 To CLEMAM
 To Encyclopedia of Life
 World Register of Marine Species

edgarii
Gastropods described in 1896